Morley Old Hall is a Grade I-listed moated manor house built in the sixteenth century in the village of Morley Saint Peter, some twelve miles from the cathedral city of Norwich, Norfolk, England. 

The house was created circa 1600 by John Sedley, an architect to Henry VII. It is built to a U-shaped floor plan in two storeys with two storeys of attics. Constructed in brick with plain-tiled roofs it is completely surrounded by a moat.

In recent years the house has been owned by Field Marshal Sir Edmund Ironside, Commander in Chief of Home Forces during the Second World War and, in the 1970s, by Janet Shand Kydd, the first wife of Peter Shand Kydd, stepfather of Diana, Princess of Wales.

Before its sale in 2001 the hall was nearing dereliction, and one main wall had collapsed into the moat. In May 2009, it was put up for sale for £2.65 million. Following approximately £1m of renovation work by the new owners, Richard and Alison Warden, it was again put up for sale in April 2012 for £3 million.

References

Houses completed in 1600
Country houses in Norfolk
Grade I listed buildings in Norfolk
Grade I listed houses
Tudor architecture